Bieringen is a suburban district of Rottenburg am Neckar in the administrative district of Tübingen in Baden-Württemberg, Germany.

Geography 

Bieringen is located 9 km (5.59 mi) southwestern from Rottenburg am Neckar in the Neckar valley.

Extent 

The territory of the district is 689 hectares. Thereof fall 52.9% upon agriculturally used area, 37.2% upon forest area, 7.5% upon settlement area and roads, 1.2% upon water area and 0.6% upon other.

Population 

Bieringen has a population of 689 people (31/01/08). It is one of the smaller villages that belong to Rottenburg. At an area of 6.86 km² (2.6 sq mi) this corresponds to a population density of 101 people per km², or 261 per sq mi.

Faiths 

The population of the village is predominantly Roman Catholic.

References

External links 
 Official Webpage (German)

Rottenburg am Neckar